Karai is a fictional supporting character appearing in Teenage Mutant Ninja Turtles comics and related media. She is usually a high-rank member of the Foot Clan outlaw ninja organization. She was originally introduced in Kevin Eastman and Peter Laird's comic book series Teenage Mutant Ninja Turtles in 1992. Since then, she has appeared in several different Teenage Mutant Ninja Turtles comics, television series, films, and video games. She is depicted as Shredder's second-in-command or adopted daughter in most versions and shares a rivalry with Leonardo and is at times considered his love interest. In one version of the comics, she is the granddaughter of the immortal Shredder.

In comics

Mirage Studios

The character was created by plotter Kevin Eastman, plotter-writer Peter Laird and writer-artist Jim Lawson, first appearing in cameos as an unknown woman in Mirage Studios' Teenage Mutant Ninja Turtles #53 (November 1992) and Teenage Mutant Ninja Turtles #54 (December 1992), and being named Karai in Teenage Mutant Ninja Turtles #55 (January 1993). She is introduced as one of the leaders of the mainstream Foot Clan in Japan (a member of its Council of Five) who came to New York City to restore order in the 1993 "City at War" story arc. Ever since Leonardo killed the Shredder (Oroku Saki), the Foot faction in NYC has been in chaos, with different groups warring with one another for ultimate control, save for Shredder's Elite, who have been carrying out seemingly motiveless attacks on the other factions. Shortly after arriving in New York, Karai captures Leonardo and offers the TMNT a deal: if the Turtles destroy the Elite, she will offer them a truce with the Foot Clan. After debate, the Turtles finally agree to seek Karai's assistance in dealing with the Elite. As they reach her skyscraper headquarters, they find dead Foot guards and the Foot's leader cradling a girl's corpse. It is revealed that the girl was Karai's daughter, and in despair, she makes Leonardo swear he will help her kill all of the Elite. During a final confrontation, five Elite face off against the Turtles, Karai, and her Foot Soldiers. The disguised Karai, wearing the Shredder's armor, orders the Elite to commit seppuku, but only one does. After an ensuing hard fight, the Turtles and Karai are the only ones left standing. Karai thanks the Turtles for their help, but they answer she owes them nothing but her word, to which she agree, saying that "no longer will the Foot Clan bother you", and returns to Japan. 

Karai never properly appears in Image Comics' Teenage Mutant Ninja Turtles series, despite Laird previously having considering an idea for Karai to return with "different types of ninja gear for her" as well as introducing a concept that "every new Foot soldier has a third eye ('the Eye of Karai') which is a video transceiver device that constantly relays data back to Karai's central processing computer." It is, however, revealed that she has been deposed as the leader of the Foot in Japan and is presumed to be dead. Had this series continued, Karai would have been revealed as the person behind the mask of Lady Shredder, a character introduced in the series' final issues as a third contestant vying for leadership of the Foot.

In the revival of the Mirage Studios' series by Peter Laird and Jim Lawson (without Eastman's involvement), Karai has returned to settle in New York and is using a high-tech armor. She asks Leonardo to help capture alive one of the mysterious warriors that are giving much trouble for the Foot everywhere. When Leonardo sees right through her lie about certain mystic books, even as she is usually a good liar, he suspects that something is either greatly troubling her or something is controlling her. A few weeks later, Karai visits a local high-profile nightclub, meeting Casey Jones, still longing for his wife April O'Neil who has gone on a soul-searching pilgrimage. Karai brings Jones to her private condo, where he awakens naked and remembering nothing of the previous night. He later discovers a noticeably light-hearted Karai knows something of the night before, but is hesitant to tell him. (According to Peter Laird, who shared this issue of the comic online, "what's happening with Mike, and with Karai and Casey, will have significant consequences. And I can say no more than that." Laird also noted: "It's possible that at some point we may know more about Karai's origin and her daughter. I'm not sure exactly how old Karai is, but it might just be that her daughter was adopted. In general, I consider the time span between Volume 2 and Volume 4 to be about fifteen years.")

Karai also appears in at least three stand-alone stories in the non-canon series Tales of the Teenage Mutant Ninja Turtles, including the stories of her youth and possible future, as well as in the comic book adaptation of the 2007 animated film. According to Complex, "since her comic book debut, Karai has become an extremely popular character, serving as the sometimes villain, sometimes uneasy ally of our fearsome foursome."

IDW Publishing
A completely different and much younger Karai appears in IDW Publishing's ongoing, re-imagined Teenage Mutant Ninja Turtles reboot series by Kevin Eastman, Tom Waltz and Dan Duncan (later also Andy Kuhn and Mateus Santolouco). Duncan posted a character design sketch of her on his deviantART account, writing that he prefers to "refer to her as Shredder's girlfriend." IDW's Karai was introduced in the series' tenth main issue, published in May 2012. In 2014, Waltz said Karai is one of his favorites: "Such a cool character – tough, smart, mysterious ... you just never know what she'll do next."

The comic's Oroku Karai is a descendant of Oroku Saki (the Shredder) about 300 years after his supposed death in feudal Japan. Her backstory is told in Villain Mini-series #5: as a young girl, Karai found the Ashi no Himitsu, a book detailing the secret history of the Foot Clan, in the library of her father, Oroku Yori. From there, she began to learn about the history of her ancestors in the Foot Clan and used the detailed martial arts instructions to train in the clan's unique style of ninjutsu. One night, she had a vision where Oroku Saki appeared and guided her to rebuild the Foot Clan. Having killed her own father, Karai reverted the Foot from a business enterprise to a clan of ninja warriors, training and recruiting new soldiers. Karai assisted in Oroku Saki's resurrection and remained as Chunin (second-in-command) of the clan, until Saki brainwashed Leonardo to join him, displacing Karai. Karai, in her jealousy, begins to secretly recruit for the Foot, including the creation of Bebop and Rocksteady to earn Saki's trust. After the Turtles recover Leonardo, Shredder praises her for her actions and loyalty and reinstates her as Chunin. Later, Shredder sends her to steal more resources from Krang and uses that to create Koya and Bludgeon: a mutant hawk and hammerhead shark.

After Splinter kills Shredder in issue #50, Karai offers him her sword and the role of jonin (leader) of the Foot. He accepts and gives Karai permission to travel to Japan with select soldiers to study history in order to attain honor for the Foot. She gets involved in a turf war between two Yakuza clans and is nudged by one of their leaders into embarking on a quest to recover the Kira no Ken, an ancient sword imbued with mystical powers. When she learns that she was betrayed by him, Karai ends up taking over the entire Tokyo underworld. Under the baleful influence of the sword, she starts a vicious turf war with Splinter and the original Foot Clan, critically stabbing Splinter's faithful lieutenant Jennika when she refuses to switch sides.

In other media

Television
Teenage Mutant Ninja Turtles (2003 TV series)

 Karai appears in the 2003 TV series and is voiced by Karen Neill. Abandoned by her parents at a young age in Tokyo, Karai was taken in and adopted by Ch'rell, the Utrom Shredder (in the original comics, the Shredder's only daughter was a biological offspring named Pimiko and Karai had no relation to him whatsoever). Trained in ninjutsu and an aspiring practitioner of bushido, Karai first appears as one of the highest-ranking members of the Foot Clan, similar in status to the Shredder's adopted son Hun (who holds a grudge against her); eventually, she becomes the clan's leader. Due to her internal conflict she appears, throughout the series, both as an ally and enemy to the Turtles, sharing a complicated relationship with the them, especially Leonardo. Karai was the only Foot member who knew that the Shredder was really an Utrom. After the Shredder's final defeat at the end of the third season, Karai spent all of the fourth season and fifth season swearing vengeance on the Turtles; especially Leonardo. When she appeared as a guest of April and Casey's wedding, her vendetta with the Turtles was confirmed to be finally over; though it is unknown when. Karai made her animated debut in the second season, in the loose adaption of the three-part City at War saga. Karai arrives in New York City after hearing the news of the gang war for control of the city taking place after the Shredder's reported demise, briefly capturing Leonardo and enlisting the aid of the Turtles to stop the war, with a promise an end to the Foot's feud against them in exchange for their assistance. Leonardo, believing that her Karai is honorable despite her legacy, convinces Donatello, Michelangelo, and Casey Jones to aid her (Raphael initially refuses). Together, Karai and the Turtles eventually retake control of the New York Foot and consequently its underworld. A truce is made between the Turtles and the Foot. However, the end of the story reveals that Karai has been manipulating the Turtles and working with the barely survived Shredder all along, unbeknownst to the Turtles and the New York Foot. Karai and the Foot reappear as a fully healed Ch'rell retakes control of the Foot. Realizing that their agreement with the Foot had been retracted, the Turtles decide to face the Foot again. When forced to fight Leonardo, and despite his lack of resistance, Karai proved unwilling to kill him. Karai's internal conflict between her sense of honor and loyalty to her evil father is the main thrust of her storyline in the third season, as she is pulled from both directions to take a side during their various encounters, even working together with the Turtles at times. She also appears in a cameo in Japan. Karai manages to stay in the graces of both sides until the Turtles face the Shredder again in the season's finale, where she stabs Leonardo in the shoulder, although she later prevents the Utrom Shredder from killing the Turtles while they are unconscious. In the end, the Shredder is taken prisoner and exiled, while Karai and the young head of the Foot's scientific division, Dr. Chaplin (who has a crush on her) are also captured and taken back to Earth. With her adopted father exiled and dead in the eyes of the world, an embittered and vengeful Karai takes over the Foot as well as the name of The Shredder (in a deleted scene she even says that Karai "no longer exists", completely replaced by The Shredder). This new Shredder "would retain the traditional iconic elements, but have a different treatment" Furious at what she saw as a betrayal by the Turtles, Karai spends the season plotting her revenge against them, first attacking them on the psychic plane via Foot Mystics, and later coordinating and leading an assault against them at their lair. She later once again duels Leonardo, who defeats her but then departs with the warning to leave his family alone, giving her one last chance for redemption. Karai next faces the Turtles during their attempt to retrieve a Foot amulet called the Heart of Tengu, but failing to stop them despite her efforts. Unbeknownst to the Turtles and Agent Bishop, who initially charged them with retrieving it, the Heart of Tengu was a mystical artifact that allowed the Foot to control its five Elemental Mystics, who are in reality the heralds for a man-demon that had centuries ago terrorized Japan as the real Shredder, known as the Tengu Shredder. The destruction of the artifact unleash a chain of events that results in the resurrection of the demon, whose first target is Karai for "usurping" the Shredder's name. Despite her efforts and those of the Turtles (who believe her the key to stopping him), the One and True Shredder bests Karai in battle, seriously injuring her. Rescued by the Turtles, Karai heals and, recognizing the threat the demon Shredder poses, agrees to a "temporary" alliance with her enemies. It is soon learned that because she shares the Shredder's mantle, Karai has the latent psychic ability to lower the Shredder's defenses through a shared link. This allows the Turtles an advantage in their final conflict with the demon, in which Karai helps pave the way for her namesake's destruction, while Dr. Chaplin helped to co-ordinate the battle. After the victory, Karai and Dr. Chaplin depart hand-in-hand, with her promising him to worry more about their immediate future.

Karai is not involved in any main story lines in the Fast Forward season in which the Turtles and Splinter travel a hundred years into the far-distant future, which indicates that she had grown old and died. However, she is seen during the events that would have occurred after the Turtles' return from the year 2105, as Karai has abandoned her grudge against the Turtles and is eager to become a student of the Ninja Tribunal, but Leonardo is obsessively distrustful of her, almost ruining Karai's burial ritual of the Shredder and accusing her of being a traitor, in effect leading to his own banishment from the Tribunal. As the events in this book were written by Splinter and Cody Jones to discourage the Turtles from knowing too much of their future, it is unlikely anything of the sort occurred (or will occur). Karai makes her appearance in the seventh season episode "Something Wicked". Here, she is seen as cameos in a flashback with her extraterrestrial adopted father Ch'rell, the Utrom Shredder, both in her original and new design.

In the series finale, having been invited to attend the wedding of April O'Neil and Casey Jones, and arriving at the ceremony with Dr. Chaplin by her side. She and Chaplin later assist the Turtles in fending off the sudden onslaught of the Cyber Shredder, the new Shredder and main antagonist of the seventh season. An alternate future version of Karai appears as a villain in an alternate-future third-season episode "Same As It Never Was", in which she is serving the Shredder following his successful conquest of the Earth, in a timeline where Donatello vanished and the Turtles fell apart without his stabilising influence. She and her robots kill Michelangelo, Leonardo and Raphael, but she is then herself killed by the missiles fired by April. 

Teenage Mutant Ninja Turtles (2012 TV series)
 In the 3D CGI version, Karai debuts in the first season voiced by Kelly Hu. Nickelodeon published early character design sketches of their interpretation of Karai on the Internet. In the series, Karai is a 16-year-old teenager and rebellious member of The Foot and a master kunoichi with strong ties to the Shredder. The character was introduced in the episode "New Girl in Town". Leonardo gains affections for her after first seeing her which he retains during the series. She used her cunning tactics to coerce Leonardo into shouldering less responsibility and live his own life. Wanting to see him at midnight, she showed him the legendary katana of Miyamoto Musashi and expressed a desire to have him steal with her. When he refused, she became "bored", saying how doing such dishonorable things were "fun". She then left him to fend off Snakeweed, but not before throwing her tanto knife near his head which allowed the Turtle leader to break free.

She had made her second appearance in "The Alien Agenda", where she first encountered the inter-dimensional aliens known as the Kraang. Curious about these extraterrestrials and their involvement with the Turtles, Karai had followed to retrieve an inactive Kraangdroid which she demonstrated to the Shredder and Baxter Stockman, thinking that the scientist could make use of such complex technology from space. Shredder then ordered her to learn more about the Kraang, as their highly advanced technology would prove quite useful in their centuries-old feud with Splinter and the Turtles. In the first season finale, "Showdown, Part 2", it is revealed that Karai is, in fact, Miwa, the only child and supposedly deceased infant daughter of Hamato Yoshi and his late wife Tang Shen, who was abducted by Shredder as an infant after the battle that resulted in Tang Shen's unfortunate demise fifteen years ago. The Shredder has since raised her as his own, renaming her "Karai" and telling her that Splinter was responsible for her mother's death. Turning to a shocked and shaken Splinter, she turned to strike him down in retaliation for "taking her mother's life." When he refused to battle her, she furiously voiced his cowardice.

 Karai reappears in the second season episode "Follow the Leader". She becomes very interested in the Turtles' frequent hunt for the dozens of mutagen canisters scattered across NYC and forms a plan to trap them. She is later seen looking at a torn photograph of her late mother when she is ambushed the new Footbots, a latest invention of the Kraang for Oroku Saki. Although overpowered by their impressive fighting techniques, Shredder emerges to inform her that he is leaving for Japan to take care of "urgent business." He warns her not to make any moves against the Turtles until his return to New York, that obedience comes with a stiff penalty. In the two-part episode "The Manhattan Project", Leo tells Karai the truth that Splinter is her biological father, but she dismisses it as a lie. In "The Wrath of Tiger Claw", she begins to have doubts towards whether or not Shredder is telling the truth. She "lies" to Leonardo, saying that she believed she is Splinter's daughter so that way she can go to the Turtles’ Lair to investigate to see if the Turtles are telling the truth and contacts Tiger Claw just in case if she needs backup, but when she found out that she really was Splinter's child, she regretted her past actions and for contacting Tiger Claw and tried to make up for them by helping the Turtles fight Tiger Claw. She is overpowered and taken back to Shredder, who imprisoned her now that she knew the truth about her parentage and true clan.

Karai made two nonspeaking cameos in "The Legend of the Kuro Kabuto" when she was visited by Shredder who tried to explain that it would have been wrong for her to be raised by "scum like Splinter" and that he had done only what he had to do, what he knew was right. She turned away from her "father", refusing to even acknowledge his presence. Once he had left, she began hacking away at the bars of her prison cell, determined to escape. In "Vengeance is Mine", Karai is rescued by the Turtles and brought back to the lair. However, after hearing the story of their rivalry and her mother's death from her biological father, she got so angry that she returned to Shredder's lair to put an end to him once and for all, only to be captured once more. Shredder's real plan was to use her as bait to mutate the Turtles into snakes - reasoning that, as the natural enemy of the rat, the mutated turtle-snakes would then eat Splinter, who would be unable to fight his sons - but he accidentally causes Karai to fall into the mutagen, turning her into a mutant snake that goes on a rampage before escaping as she regains control of herself when about to kill Splinter. Although Donatello hopes to create a retro-mutagen to cure Karai, it is revealed that she is a special kind of mutant and can almost completely change back to her human self, retaining only her greenish snake eyes, venomous fangs, and prehensile tongue.

In the second season two-part finale, "The Invasion", Karai had two non-speaking cameos; where she appeared near an alley way to hide from the Kraang, and at the end when she had rescued her biological father from drowning to the death in the sewer. She checked his vital organs and warmly nudged him before taking off in the sewers. She also appeared in a flashback when Shredder was reminiscing her training as a young girl, to her unintentional mutation into a mindless purple-and-white snake. She was shown saving Splinter from drowning in a drain pipe. She had brought him to shore, and checked his vital signs before returning to the waters of the sewer. In the third season episode "Serpent Hunt", Karai is chased by Anton Zeck, Ivan Steranko, Rahzar, and Fishface to be taken to Shredder, who intends to have "his daughter" back, only under his complete control. Donatello observes that her mind is becoming more snake-like as time goes on, as she can hardly even speak, but she still acknowledged her former enemies as friends and said goodbye to them before departing into the city. She is captured and given to Shredder, who has Baxter begin to work on a mind control serum to get Karai back on his side.

In "The Deadly Venom", not only has Baxter successfully helped Karai control her mutation (allowing her to remain in human form but shape-shift her arms into snakes, as well as infect her enemies with various toxins, poisons and acidic venom), but he also brainwashes her into working for and obeying the Shredder once again, forcing her to call him "Father" against her will. She is forced to hunt down the Turtles, and their trusted human allies (April O'Neil and Casey Jones) to ultimately get to Splinter. After infecting April, Casey, Mikey and Raphael with her incurably lethal snake's venom, she faced Leonardo; one-on-one who had managed to counteract her lethal venom by utilizing his newly developed healing gifts of "the healing hands" mantra Splinter had taught him earlier. Although defeated, she managed to escape while Leonardo was distracted. Many nights later, in "Attack of the Mega Shredder", Karai is seen connected to a Kraang-like contraction that injects her brain with multiple brain-worms. She again staged a plan to capture the Turtles' and place in four separate traps. This would then force Splinter to fight her to the bitter end for his sons' lives. Fortunately, Splinter later used his "healing hand" mantra, which weakened the brain-worm inside her head, causing her to spit it out, therefore restoring her free will. Although the Turtles' searched long and hard, she had fled from the city of New York; presumably back to Japan.

Many months later, Karai is later used by Splinter and April as a motivation for the Shredder to aid in fending off the Triceraton invasion in season three two-part finale "Annihilation: Earth!", but Shredder ultimately betrays and kills Splinter anyway in cold blood. Karai is then killed off-screen with the Earth's destruction, but she is saved when the Ninja Turtles create a brand-new timeline in "Earth's Last Stand". Finally free of the vile brain-worm that had controlled her, a furious Karai focuses all her efforts on taking down Oroku Saki and his criminal empire with the help of her old friend Shinigami, a Buddhist witch who possesses extraordinarily powerful dark magic. To give more thought to her new drive, new Foot soldiers are recruited for her own army which she herself commands. Unfortunately, she is later captured by the Shredder (who has now become an unusually strong bladed, muscular mutant himself) and used as a leverage to force Splinter into another duel to the death. Suspended in chains, Karai is forced to watch as her one true father is constantly pulverized by the Super Shredder's immense strength. She manages to use her mutant-snake abilities to break free of her restraints and joins up with April and the Turtles but are blocked by several Chrome Domes. Later, Karai runs off with April and the Turtles to the Undercity and is horrified to see her father, Splinter, barely holding his own against Super Shredder. Before she can rush to her father's aid, more Chrome Domes attack and she watches in horror as Splinter and Oroku Saki fall 1,000 feet; presumably to their deaths.

Karai then joins with Leonardo and April, to attract Oroku Saki to the surface. Ambushed by Tiger Claw, she defends April and comes to assist Leonardo, who is being torn apart by Super Shredder. She brutally attacks him with her tanto. She is almost crushed to death by a truck but is saved by April's strong telekinetic grip. She distracts Saki by "offering him the chance of redemption" without the need for vengeance, which was merely a ruse for a badly injured Leonardo to escape. She then took advantage of the Super Shredder's distraction to attack him directly by punching his pulsating mutated heart. She abandoned the chase to help April get Leonardo back for medical attention. Some weeks later, Karai is shown to be working with the Mighty Mutanimals to plan her next move. She is shocked when they are interrupted by the sudden arrival of Super Shredder himself. She furiously attempts to attack him with her tanto but is blasted backward by his spiked mutated arm, is seriously hurt and knocked unconsciousness by the burning debris. She is saved by Leonardo (who desperately performed CPR to save her from more smoke inhalation) and is taken to the hospital by Shinigami. She eventually regains consciousness in a hospital bed, and is shown to be wearing a neck brace; attached to a life-support machine. The Turtles' sadly inform her of the death of her father and their defeat at the hands of the Super Shredder. She weakly tells Leonardo to put an end to all of this, and that she will always believe in him. She is later shown next to Leonardo on the building of Stockman Industries with a broken arm. She tells Leonardo that there is nothing for him to apologize for, and thanks him for doing what no one else could: finish off the Shredder. She looks on at the skies, where the spirit of Splinter watches over her and the others with pride.

Starting in the fifth season, Karai and her good friend Shinigami were traveling in the dead of night in pursuit of Foot soldiers who had double-crossed her, as they accused her of not being worthy to rule the Foot clan. She was suddenly attacked by a mysterious, masked warrior. She was shocked her to discover that it was, in fact, her old teacher and mentor- Hatori Tatsu. After escaping (thanks to Shinigami's dark arts) she came to the Lair to warn the Turtles of Tatsu's desire to rule as the new Shredder, with the mutated, legendary Kuro Kabuto itself in his possession. She is angered and horrified when told that Tiger Claw and his Foot cult is seeking the Kabuto to return Oroku Saki to life. She resolved for them all to find Tatsu and take him down while recovering the Kuro Kabuto, as it is the key that gives its wearer full control over the entire Foot clan. With Leonardo to back her up, Karai appeared at the warehouse where the Kabuto laid and sneaked up behind Tatsu, ready to strike the swordsman down. However, her gambit proved foolish, as her old teacher sensed her presence and beat her again with little effort. In a fury, she knocked off his silver oni mask, revealing him to be blind. With Leonardo's aid, she was capable of putting him off guard and severely bite him with her snake fangs; thus infecting him with her lethal venom as well. She then turned to the Foot soldiers, stating that Tatsu had been merely using them and tarnishing the name of the Foot clan for his own glory, just as the Shredder had; that the Foot Clan deserves a noble destiny, one with honor and morality. In "Heart of Evil", Karai later worked alongside April who were pursuing Bebop on a motorbike. When the bike was destroyed by the mutant-warthog's purple energy whips, she was saved from sustaining any injury via April's strong telekinetic abilities. She then fought Kavaxas by even turning full snake and managed to gain the mystical Seal of the Ancients from him for a short time. Some nights later, in "End Times", Karai aided her April and the Turtles in recovering the fragments of Shredder's heart. She road with April on a motorcycle in pursuit of Bebop. When they were seen, she was saved from falling hard by April's incredibly strong telekinesis. Despite her best efforts, she was not able to stop the heart of her adopted "father" from falling into the hands of Tiger Claw and Kavaxas. She eventually shows up at the Lair riding on Leatherhead's back. She then went with Leonardo, Michelangelo and Leatherhead to stop Kavaxas and the revived, zombie-like Super Shredder. She watched as the two were dragged into the Netherworld via a portal. As the sunset, she bed a final farewell to her father's spirit in the form a warm and loving hug. She wanted to appreciate the beautiful sunset with Leonardo and the others before going home.

In the two-part episode "When Worlds Collide", Karai seems to remain with the Ninja Turtles and her good friend April O'Neil in the Lair, where she frequently spars with Leonardo, whom she expressed her mutual romantic feelings for during their "playful" training sessions. She waited on the rooftops as the two Salamandrians arrived, and was obviously repulsed that Raphael had a thing for "a big newt." She agreed to work together with them to stop the Newtralizer from wiping out the Utroms. When the extraterrestrial bug Lord Dregg invaded, Karai was shocked at Leonardo's capture. She tried to hold off the hordes of Vreen, but was eventually taken to Dregg's spaceship as well. Once released, she fought alongside Leonardo, Donatello and April against Lord Dregg, but was easily beaten. Upon the destruction of the Newtralizer via electrocution, she expressed sadness when Michelangelo offered to use his temporarily acquired electric-generating abilities to buy her and the Turtles enough time to abandon ship; seemingly sacrificing his own life in the process. When Michelangelo reappeared unscathed, Karai assured him that today was a win and that they should celebrate. She expressed her exasperation when Raphael and Mona Lisa shared a loving hug.

 In "The Frankenstein Experiment" Karai briefly appeared in an illusion that the mummified Pharaoh had cast to torment Leonardo, as a vampire with the Super Shredder behind her, which gravely worried the Turtle leader. In "The Foot Walks Again" and "The Big Blowout" Karai returns, along with her good friend Shinigami (who was previously injured by Tatsu along with Casey), and confronts the much less intimidating Shredder from the 2D world of the '80s–90s Ninja Turtles. She joins up with her allies April and Casey, and later the Ninja Turtles, their 1980s counterparts and the Mighty Mutanimals, to stop the present Bebop and Rocksteady from working with Krang and Shredder to rip apart both dimensions and destroy the entire multiverse.

Rise of the Teenage Mutant Ninja Turtles
Voiced by Gwendoline Yeo, Karai debuts in the four-part series finale as ancestress of Splinter as the ninja master-turned-rat's maternal great-great-great-great grandmother, which prompted the Turtles to call her "Gram-Gram." In this comedic series, she is the biological daughter of Oroku Saki as opposed to being adopted by him, who recognized just how corrupt her father's soul was by the dark magical armor that warped him into the relentless, villainous Shredder. To put a stop to this battle of bloodshed, Karai went against her father and founded the Hamato Clan and imprisoned her own father in the Twilight Realm along with herself for five centuries.

After valiantly and tirelessly battling the once peaceful Foot Clan, Hamato Karai's spirit ended trapped within the Twilight Realm to suppress Shredder's full strength, and was referred to as "the weapon that could put an end to the Shredder" by her Hamato descendants, one of whom was Splinter's late mother. Once found by the Turtles and Splinter, she was surprised to see turtles and a rat standing on two legs and introduced herself as Hamato Karai, much to Splinter's excitement at meeting finally his maternal great-great-great-great grandmother. In the end, Oroku Saki is released from the dark force that had consumed his entire being and hugs his long-lost daughter. She then leaves for the Heavens with Saki's own essence to finally rest in peace.

Film

 Karai appears in TMNT, voiced by Zhang Ziyi. In the film, Karai is the new leader of the Foot, hired by the mysterious billionaire Max Winters to help him and his Stone Generals hunt down the thirteen ancient immortal monsters. She fights with Leonardo (whom she clearly recognizes) and rejects his offer to help them, also engaging in battle with April O'Neil while the Foot battles the Turtles and their allies. During the tide of the battle, both the Foot Clan and the Turtles realized that Winters, revealing himself to be an immortal warlord named Yaotl, only wanted the monsters to be returned to their world to undo the immortality curse he and his Stone Generals had endured. Unfortunately, the Stone Generals have betrayed Winters by deliberately missing the final monster and intend to use the portal to finalize their conquest of Earth. When the Stone Generals offer the Foot a chance to join them in world conquest, Karai refuses, saying that they would honor their contract to Winters. Aided by April and Casey, she then leads her ninja in retrieving the last of the monsters. In the end, Karai parts ways with the Turtles peacefully, but gives a cryptic last word that Turtles "have passed" something (she refuses to elaborate) and "soon we will have further business together; the kind that involves familiar faces from your past", implying on the Shredder's inevitable return to life.

 Karai appears in Turtles Forever, with Karen Neill reprising her role from the 2003 animated series. She frees Ch'rell from the clutches of the 1987 series' Shredder, Krang, Bebop, and Rocksteady. Karai then aids the Shredder in modifying the Technodrome with Utrom technology. The Utrom Shredder, consumed with rage for revenge on the Turtles, wants to destroy every dimension where the Ninja Turtles exist even though it will most likely destroy himself, but Karai intervenes, rescuing the classic Turtles, the 1987 Shredder, Krang, and the 2003 Splinter. In the end, at the Turtles Prime dimension (Mirage Turtles), Karai fights alongside the Turtles, Splinter, as well as the 1987 series' Shredder and Krang, to stop the Utrom Shredder's insane plot. Even though Ch'rell is blown to smithereens, seemingly for good, Karai states that he shall return.
 Karai appears in Teenage Mutant Ninja Turtles, portrayed by Minae Noji. Karai is depicted as Shredder's assistant who leads many of the Foot Clan's field missions. Karai is seen many times accompanying Eric Sacks and Shredder. Karai is last seen in a car chase with the Turtles where Raphael causes her jeep to crash into a tree.
 Karai appears in Teenage Mutant Ninja Turtles: Out of the Shadows, with Brittany Ishibashi replacing Minae Noji in the role. She is still Shredder's right-hand woman, acting as both a bodyguard and assistant. She also works closely with Baxter Stockman. Karai is last seen in a fight with April, which ends with April knocking Karai out.

Video games
Karai appears as the final boss in the Sega Genesis and Super Nintendo Entertainment System versions of Teenage Mutant Ninja Turtles: Tournament Fighters. She is a secret unlockable playable character through the use of a cheat code in the SNES version (in the Genesis version she is only unlockable with the use of a cheat device). In the story mode of the SNES version, "Master Karai" (who is not known to the Turtles) arrives in New York with "the forces of the Shredder Elite" in order to avenge the Shredder, and kidnaps Splinter and April to lure the Turtles into fighting her minions (apparently including the Shredder); before her boss fight, Splinter says Karai "possesses super human powers." In the Tournament mode, "a very strong fighter by the name of 'Karai'" is announced by April to be "still alive" and challenges the winner of the titular fighting tournament to fight her (the final fight takes place on a moving train). In the Genesis version, Karai has a different backstory, in which she in league with Krang has sent the Turtles' clones to kidnap Master Splinter into Dimension X. She suddenly reveals herself to be the true mastermind behind this at the end of the game, following the player's defeat of Krang (in addition, the regular ending has Karai saying that it was only her clone that has been destroyed, as she can be truly killed only in the alternative ending after finishing the game at the hardest difficulty setting).
Karai appears as a boss and an unlockable playable character in Teenage Mutant Ninja Turtles 2: Battle Nexus, voiced by Karen Neill. In the game's story mode, the Turtles meet Karai after she very uneasily decided to obey the Shredder's order to put them to death. After defeating Karai in combat, Leonardo pleads for her to choose honor over the loyalty to the Shredder, even going as far as allowing her to strike him down if she chooses so, but she finds unable to do so and asks him to kill her instead. Leonardo refuses in turn and leaves, telling her that he believes they will one day understand each other. 
Karai appears as the penultimate boss in Teenage Mutant Ninja Turtles 3: Mutant Nightmare, voiced again by Karen Neill.
Karai has a voice-only appearance in TMNT, voiced by Jennifer Morehouse.
 Kara appears as a boss in TMNT. She appears masked and displays more abilities in the fight against her than she does in the 2007 animated film (including duplication and teleportation).
Karai appears as a playable character in Teenage Mutant Ninja Turtles: Smash-Up, voiced by Karen Neill. In the game's story mode, featuring a motion comic with an original plot co-written by Peter Laird, Karai looks more like in Mirage comics and is the Shredder's daughter who appears to ally with the Turtles. But after they defeat the Shredder, Karai reveals that she used the Turtles to get rid of him so she could usurp the Foot Clan as a next in line. Unexpectedly, the Shredder rises up, but Leonardo kicks him into Karai, landing them into the alien Transmat device that then teleports them away and "that problem is solved."
 Karai appears as a boss in Teenage Mutant Ninja Turtles: Arcade Attack.
 Karai appears as a recurring boss in Teenage Mutant Ninja Turtles: Out of the Shadows, voiced by Renee Faia.
 Karai appears in Teenage Mutant Ninja Turtles, voiced by Kelly Hu. She stops Leonardo, Donatello, Michelangelo, and Raphael and tells the Foot Clan to attack them.
 Karai appears as a boss in Teenage Mutant Ninja Turtles: Danger of the Ooze, voiced by Kelly Hu.
 Karai appears as a boss in Teenage Mutant Ninja Turtles: Mutants in Manhattan, voiced by Tammy Nishimura.

Toys
Playmates Toys released an action figure of Karai from the 2003 cartoon in her Shredder armor (with a removable helmet) in 2005, packed with bonus DVD. 
Playmates also released a larger action figure based on as she has appeared in the film TMNT (featuring a changeable head, with or without the face mask and hood) in 2007. 
In 2014, the TMNT Lego set included two versions of Karai: from the ongoing TV show, and from the new movie.
Karai from the Mirage comic series was included in the first wave of TMNT Blind Box miniature Funko Mystery Minis action figures.
A "Karai Snake" action figure from the 2012 cartoon was released by Playmates in 2015.
A "Human Karai" action figure from the 2012 cartoon was released by Playmates in 2016.

See also
Chibiusa
List of Teenage Mutant Ninja Turtles characters
Official website Ninja Turtles

Notes

References

External links
 Karai (comic book character) – Comic Vine

Action film characters
Adventure film characters
Comics characters introduced in 1992
Female characters in comics
Female superheroes
Female supervillains
Fictional adoptees
Fictional characters who can stretch themselves
Fictional characters who can teleport
Fictional female assassins
Fictional female businesspeople
Fictional female ninja
Fictional female swordfighters
Fictional human hybrids
Fictional kenjutsuka
Fictional kyūjutsuka
Fictional Ninjutsu practitioners
Fictional immigrants to the United States
Fictional Japanese American people
Fictional characters from Tokyo
Fictional orphans
Fictional mutants
Fictional snakes
Fictional swordfighters in comics
Fictional toxicologists
Japanese superheroes
Fictional women soldiers and warriors
Science fiction film characters
Teenage Mutant Ninja Turtles characters
Video game bosses
Female soldier and warrior characters in comics